Beckingham is a civil parish in the Bassetlaw District of Nottinghamshire, England.  The parish contains 15 listed buildings that are recorded in the National Heritage List for England.  Of these, one is listed at Grade II*, the middle of the three grades, and the others are at Grade II, the lowest grade.  The parish contains the village of Beckingham and the surrounding countryside.  Most of the listed buildings are houses, farmhouses and associated structures, and the others include a church and its churchyard wall, three buildings associated with Beckingham railway station, and a war memorial.


Key

Buildings

References

Citations

Sources

 

Lists of listed buildings in Nottinghamshire